Jamal Aman Jones (born April 24, 1981) is a former American football wide receiver. He was originally signed by the St. Louis Rams as an undrafted free agent in 2004.  He played college football at North Carolina A&T.  Jones is currently pursuing a master's degree in Public Administration from the Harvard Kennedy School.

Early years
Jones attended DeMatha Catholic High School in Hyattsville, Maryland and was a letterman in football.  Jones graduated from DeMatha in 1999.

External links
Philadelphia Eagles bio

1981 births
Living people
Players of American football from Washington, D.C.
American football wide receivers
North Carolina A&T Aggies football players
St. Louis Rams players
Green Bay Packers players
Frankfurt Galaxy players
New Orleans Saints players
Philadelphia Eagles players
Harvard Kennedy School alumni